Sonbarsa is a village in Jagdishpur block of Bhojpur district in Bihar, India. As of 2011, its population was 1,244, in 201 households. It is located just northwest of the city of Jagdishpur.

References 

Villages in Bhojpur district, India